Kvakhtyuga is a rural locality (a settlement) in Osinovskoye Rural Settlement of Vinogradovsky District, Arkhangelsk Oblast, Russia. The population was 86 as of 2010. There are 7 streets.

Geography 
Kvakhtyuga is located on the Vayenga River, 30 km northeast of Bereznik (the district's administrative centre) by road. Verkhnyaya Vayenga is the nearest rural locality.

References 

Rural localities in Vinogradovsky District